Jurandir Corrêa dos Santos (26 April 1912 – 4 March 1972), known as just Jurandir, was a Brazilian footballer. He played in eight matches for the Brazil national football team from 1937 to 1944. He was also part of Brazil's squad for the 1937 South American Championship.

References

External links
 

1912 births
1972 deaths
Brazilian footballers
Brazil international footballers
Place of birth missing
Association footballers not categorized by position